The Bo Yang Museum is a museum in West Central District, Tainan, Taiwan. The museum is part of the National University of Tainan (NUTN) and it is dedicated to the Taiwanese writer Bo Yang.

History
The initial discussion about returning Bo Yang's belongings started in November 2006. The room for keeping his collections was inaugurated on 21 March 2007. The Ministry of Education approved the subsidy to set up Bo Yang Museum on 8 May 2007. The museum was finally inaugurated on 27 June 2007.

Architecture
The museum is a two-story building, located at the Special Art District of NUTN. It is divided into four sections, which are Bo Yang Art Center, Bo Yang Historical Section, Bo Yang Literature Corner and Bo Yang's Garden House Living Room.

Transportation
The museum is accessible within walking distance south from Tainan Station of the Taiwan Railways.

See also
 List of museums in Taiwan

References

External links
 

2007 establishments in Taiwan
Biographical museums in Taiwan
Literary museums in Taiwan
Museums in Tainan
Museums established in 2007
University museums in Taiwan